The 2022–23 Serie A is the 56th season of the women's football top-level league in Italy. It will be the first season to be fully professional.

Summary

Changes 
Compared to the 2021–22 season, the number of participating teams decreased from 12 to 10. Indeed, from the 2021–22 Serie A, Napoli, Lazio and Verona were relegated to Serie B, while from the 2021–22 Serie B only Como was promoted.

Parma Calcio 1913 purchased the licence of S.S.D. Empoli Ladies FBC and renamed it Parma Calcio 2022.

Format 
The Serie A became fully-professional from the 2022–23 season, removing the salary cap and allowing teams to pay their players a higher wage. Women's footballers became the first female athletes in Italy to be fully professional.

With the reduction of the participating teams, the format of the competition also changed. The season takes place in two phases: in the first phase, the 10 participating teams face each other in a round-robin tournament with home and away matches for a total of 18 matchdays. In the second phase the top-five ranked teams qualify to the championship round (poule scudetto), while the last-five ranked teams play the relegation round. Each team starts in the second phase with the points earned during the first phase. In both rounds, the five participating teams face each other in a round-robin tournament with home and away matches for a total of an additional 10 matchdays, with two rest sessions for each team. At the end of the second phase, the first ranked in the championship round is crowned champion of Italy and qualifies to the 2023–24 UEFA Women's Champions League alongside the second placed team. In the relegation round the last-ranked team is relegated directly to the Serie B, while the second-last team plays the second-placed in the Serie B for a place in the 2023–24 Serie A.

Teams

Team changes

Stadiums and locations

First phase

League table

Results

Second phase

Championship round

Relegation round

Season statistics

Top scorers

Notes

References

External links

 Official Website

2022–23 domestic women's association football leagues
2022-23
Women